Rear of the Year was a British award for celebrities who were considered to have an attractive posterior. It was created by publicity consultant Anthony Edwards in 1976. Initially, it was awarded only to women, but in 1986 the first award was made to a man and from 1997, it was awarded annually to one woman and one man.

By 2015 the award was generating a level of media coverage equivalent to £4 million (US$ million) Advertising Value Equivalent. The award was organised by Rear of the Year Limited until the company was dissolved in 2021. The last contest was held in 2019.

History
Edwards initiated the award as a way to promote specific brands of jeans. Barbara Windsor won the first award in 1976, which was presented as a one-off publicity stunt. Five years later it became an annual event with Felicity Kendal receiving the honours. The 1982 winner Suzi Quatro commented: "I’ve been told since I was about eight or nine that I had a nice ass... So, when I won the award, I was actually quite proud." The singer Lulu, who won the 1983 award, was later asked by a journalist if she felt that she had been the subject of objectification when she won the award, and replied: 'I think you're taking this all much too seriously'. On winning the award in 1985, Lynsey de Paul quipped "I would like to thank the organisers from the heart of my bottom". In 1986, the award was presented to a man for the first time (Michael Barrymore) and 1991 saw Marina Ogilvy, the daughter of Princess Alexandra, became the first royal recipient. A male award was given to Richard Fairbrass in 1994 and from 1997 the male award became a regular part of the annual event. The 2002 award to Charlotte Church attracted controversy as the winner had only recently turned 16 at the time.

2010 winner Fiona Bruce accepted the award and participated in a photoshoot, happily posing for pictures in tight jeans. However, she subsequently described the award as "the most hypocritical, ridiculous, ludicrous thing I’ve ever done."

In 2014, Carol Vorderman became the first person to receive the award for a second time, joking: "I always suspected there were a lot of people out there who were glad to see the back of me. It now appears there were even more than I thought."

The winners of the award were selected by public vote, a process that sometimes accrued popular campaigns for particular individuals. The winners were usually actors in soap operas, contestants in reality TV shows or pop stars. Edwards has described the contest as "an excellent monitor of fashions in body shape". In 2012 he declared that female rears were starting to slim down as more women took to the gym, jogging and keeping trim during that Olympic year. In 2018 he said that "the trend is towards a shapely, well-toned and, above all, proportionate rear".

A number of businesses sponsored the award including manufacturers of beauty products, Cadbury and Wizard Jeans. Award winners were given a commemorative plaque in the form of an engraved crystal trophy. Until 2016 the award was promoted with a winner's photo op that was reported in the UK's tabloid newspapers. The event, staged for some years at The Dorchester hotel in London, was attended by numerous press photographers and included a champagne reception. Some winners subsequently described ambivalent feelings about their photo ops, during which they were photographed from behind. 2007 winner Siân Lloyd described hers as "probably the weirdest photocall I’ve attended in my life", while 2003 winner Natasha Hamilton said of seeing her pictures in the press: "I just didn’t like it. It seemed a little bit crass and seedy."

Winners
Recipients included:

1976 — Barbara Windsor 
1981 — Felicity Kendal
1982 — Suzi Quatro
1983 — Lulu
1984 — Elaine Paige
1985 — Lynsey de Paul
1986 — Anneka Rice and Michael Barrymore 
1987 — Anita Dobson
1988 — Su Pollard
1989 — No competition 
1990 — No competition
1991 — Marina Ogilvy
1992 — Ulrika Jonsson
1993 — Sarah Lancashire
1994 — Mandy Smith and Richard Fairbrass
1995 — No competition
1996 — Tracy Shaw
1997 — Melinda Messenger and Gary Barlow
1998 — Carol Smillie and Frank Skinner
1999 — Denise van Outen and Robbie Williams
2000 — Jane Danson and Graham Norton
2001 — Claire Sweeney and John Altman
2002 — Charlotte Church and Scott Wright
2003 — Natasha Hamilton and Ronan Keating
2004 — Alex Best and Aled Haydn Jones
2005 — Nell McAndrew and Will Young
2006 — Javine Hylton and Ian Wright
2007 — Siân Lloyd and Lee Mead
2008 — Jennifer Ellison and Ryan Thomas
2009 — Rachel Stevens and Russell Watson
2010 — Fiona Bruce and Ricky Whittle
2011 — Carol Vorderman and Anton du Beke
2012 — Shobna Gulati and John Barrowman
2013 — Flavia Cacace and Vincent Simone
2014 — Carol Vorderman and Olly Murs
2015 — Kym Marsh and Daniel Radcliffe
2016 — Jennifer Metcalfe and Tom Hiddleston
2017 — Rachel Riley and Idris Elba
2018 — Michelle Keegan and Aidan Turner 
2019 — Amanda Holden and Andy Murray

Similar contests
 In 2013, a University of Cambridge newspaper held its own version of the award in which the contestants were naked.

 Miss Bumbum is an annual contest in Brazil to choose the best female buttocks in the country.

References

External links
 Official website 

1976 establishments in the United Kingdom
Awards established in 1976
British awards
Annual events in the United Kingdom
Buttocks